Employee of the Month is a 2004 American black comedy film written and directed by Mitch Rouse. The film stars Matt Dillon, Christina Applegate, and Steve Zahn.

Plot
Dave Walsh (Matt Dillon) is a bank employee whose day begins badly when he gets fired from his dream job and dumped by his fiancée Sara Goodwin (Christina Applegate) the day after their engagement party was crashed by his best friend, Jack (Steve Zahn). Jack tries to console him by telling him that it's for the best, that Dave was headed down the wrong path. In a further effort to console him, Jack arranges for a hooker named Whisper (Jenna Fischer) to show up at his apartment, but instead she steals his car. The next day, Dave goes back to the bank with a gun tucked into in his waistband. He surreptitiously makes his way into his former boss's office, where he pulls out the gun and threatens to end his boss's life. Though intimidated, the boss stands up to Dave, and Dave, deciding he does not want blood on his hands after all, pistol-whips him instead.

When Dave emerges from his boss's office, he finds the bank being robbed. A sequence shows him killing the robbers single-handedly, but this is then shown to have been a daydream. When one of the robbers seizes his co-worker Wendy (Andrea Bendewald), he shoots the robber and saves her, but he is shot, tackled, and forced into the getaway vehicle, whereupon the robbers make their escape.

A montage shows various people's reactions to the incident, including that of Dave's ex-fiancée Sara (who is crying uncontrollably), and then a burning van. A reporter announces that dental records have shown that the body found in the van was Dave's. A complex series of plot twists follows. It turns out that the robbery had actually been part of plan hatched two years ago, by Dave and his friends Jack, Wendy, and Eric (Dave Foley), to rob the bank and fake Dave's death, erasing his identity so that he would not be caught, and leaving him and his friends filthy rich. Eric, who is Sara's dentist, is revealed to have driven the getaway vehicle and falsified the dental records of the corpse in the van. Dave, Wendy, and Jack meet up in a motel room, prepared to divide their loot and part ways. When Wendy leaves the room, however, Dave kills Jack. (It turns out that Dave had secretly hated Jack ever since Jack scarred Dave's face and torso extensively in a childhood accident.) Wendy returns and kills Dave. She grabs the money and runs off to pick up Sara, with whom it turns out she's involved in a romantic relationship. (Sara, for her part, had previously gone to Eric's office, killed him, and taken his share of the money.) After the credits, Sara and Wendy's car is shown being hit by a bus.

Cast
 Matt Dillon as David Walsh
 Steve Zahn as Jack
 Christina Applegate as Sara Goodwin
 Andrea Bendewald as Wendy
 Dave Foley as Eric
 Jenna Fischer as Whisper
 Fiona Gubelmann as Amber
 Lynn Milgrim as Mrs. Chapman
 Peter Jason as Bill Gartin

External links
 
 

2004 films
2004 black comedy films
2004 comedy films
American black comedy films
American crime comedy films
American buddy films
2000s English-language films
2000s American films